Pho Thale is a district (amphoe) in the southwestern part of Phichit province, central Thailand.

Geography
Neighboring districts are (from the northwest clockwise) Bueng Na Rang, Taphan Hin, Bang Mun Nak of Phichit Province, Chum Saeng, Kao Liao and Banphot Phisai of Nakhon Sawan province.

History
In 1939, the district office was moved from Bang Khlan Sub-district to Ban Tan Sub-district. Later the same year, the district was renamed from Bang Khlan to Pho Thale, and the sub-district Ban Tan also to Pho Thale.

Administration
The district is divided into 11 sub-districts (tambon), which are further subdivided into 98 villages (muban). There are two sub-district municipalities (thesaban tambon) - Pho Thale covers parts of tambon Pho Thale, and Tha Sao parts of tambon Tha Sao and Tha Khamin. There are a further 11 tambon administrative organizations (TAO).

Missing numbers are tambon which now form Bueng Narang district.

References

External links
amphoe.com

Pho Thale